This is a list of all freight railroad (not streetcar or rapid transit) lines that have been built in the Delmarva Peninsula south of the Philadelphia, Wilmington and Baltimore Railroad, and does not deal with ownership changes from one company to another. The lines are named by the first company to build them. Unless noted, each railroad eventually became part of the Pennsylvania Railroad system.

See also
List of Delaware railroads
List of Maryland railroads
List of Virginia railroads

References
Citations

Sources
PRR Corporate History
Railroad History Database

 
 
 
Railroad
Railroad
Railroad